Henry  "Kiki" Saávedra (March 6, 1936 – January 28, 2019) was a Democratic member of the New Mexico House of Representatives, representing the 10th District from 1976 to 2015. Saávedra was a businessman, having attended the University of Albuquerque. Prior to his election to the New Mexico House, he served in various positions with the city of Albuquerque, where he resided. He served on the Appropriations and Transportation House Committees and was also a veteran of the United States Air National Guard.

Saávedra did not run for re-election in 2014. He died in 2019 at the age of 81 from complications of Alzheimer's disease.

References

External links
 Representative Henry Kiki Saávedra - (D) at the New Mexico House of Representatives
 Representative Henry Saávrdra (NM) at Project Vote Smart

1936 births
2019 deaths
Hispanic and Latino American state legislators in New Mexico
Democratic Party members of the New Mexico House of Representatives
Politicians from Albuquerque, New Mexico
Businesspeople from Albuquerque, New Mexico
University of Albuquerque alumni
New Mexico National Guard personnel
20th-century American businesspeople